Secret Service of the Imperial Court, also known as Police Pool of Blood, is a 1984 Hong Kong wuxia film produced by the Shaw Brothers Studio and starring Bryan Leung. The film is strikingly similar in style and plot to the 1988 ATV's The Court Secret Agent (錦衣衛), and the 2010 film 14 Blades, which starred Donnie Yen, may have been a remake of it .

Plot
Captain Zhao Wu Yi is the leader of the Brocade Guards, the government's secret police. The sergeant of the force is Zhao's elder son, Zhao Bu Fa. Zhao also has a younger son in the force, Zhao Bu Qun, whom he executes after he questions him about whether or not he would kill his father if he committed a crime, which he answers "No".

The force works under a childish, womanizing Emperor who is irresponsible to his duties. The blood thirsty Eunuch Wang Zhen usually bribes the Emperor with woman, for which the Emperor gives the eunuch his powers. Zhao Bu Fa has never been fond of the eunuch. Eunuch Wang then orders the Brocade Guards to kill two righteous guards, Yu Hua Long and Li Yi. Zhao refuses to kill them and resigns from the force. The furious eunuch then orders Zhao Wu Yi to kill his son; he sends his men to kill him but his troupe, are no match for Zhao, so Zhao survives every time.

Zhao then goes into hiding with his wife Xue Liang and son Ding Dong in his ancestral village. His whole clan are there and his uncle Zhao Wu Ji is their leader. Things work out fine, until a message is sent to the village ordering the clan to kill Zhao Bu Fa or face execution. They decide to kill Zhao, whereupon Zhao and his uncle engage in a duel and he kills his own uncle. Zhao's sister Wu Xiao Nan, who did not want to kill Zhao, later gives Zhao a poisoned cup of tea; they engage in a fight where Zhao kills Wu, and he and his family escape.

They meet up with Zhao's brother, who reveals that his execution was fake, it was just to show the Brocade Guards what would happen to them if they disobey an order. Bu Qun then treats his brother's poison and later disguises himself as his brother. He ends up sacrificing himself for his brother and family to live a peaceful life. Xue Liang repays his kindness by killing herself. The Jinyi troupe brings Bu Qun's head to show Wu Yi, who is saddened and says that he does not actually want his son to die. Eunuch Wang tries to completely take over the Emperor's throne. Zhao Bu Fa calls for a duel with Wang. They engage in a duel in the mountains and Zhao chops off Wang's left arm, later killing him by chopping him in half. After the duel, Zhao informs his father that he has killed Eunuch Wang.

Cast
Bryan Leung as Sergeant Zhao Bu Fa
Nancy Hu as Xue Liang
Tony Liu as Eunuch Wang Zhen
Ku Feng as Captain Zhao Wu Yi
Lo Mang as Zhao Bu Qun
Lo Lieh as Zhao Wu Ji
Chan Ga-kei as Zhao Wu Ji's son
Liu Yu-pu as Xiao Nan
Fong Yi-jan as Lian Lian
Ko Fei as Chao Jie Xiang
Ku Kuan-chung as Zhang Qiang
Lung Tien-hsiang as Lin Jun
Sun Chien as Li Yi
Cheung Lik as Wang Biao
Jason Pai as Yu Hua Long
Cheng Kei-ying as Shih Hen
Lau Siu-gwan as Emperor Yingzong of Ming
Cheng Miu as Official Li
Wong Ching-ho as Official Wang Yun
Pak Sha-lik as Zhao clan member
Cheung Yuet-ming as Ding Dong
Wong Pau-gei as Xue Xuan
Chan Lau as Gao Xiang
Kwan Fung as Li Zhou Min
Liu Jun-guk as Zhao Wu Yi's bodyguard
Ngai Tim-choi as brocade guard
Lee Fat-yuen as brocade guard
Ho Wing-cheung as brocade guard
Kong Chuen as brocade guard
Lee Yiu-ging as brocade guard / soldier
Shum Lo as Zhao clan member
Wang Han-chen as Zhao clan member
Lui Hung as Zhao clan member
Wong Kung-miu as Uncle Chen
Mama Hung as street hawker
Lui Tat as court official

Reception
In a review for Hong Kong Cinemagic, David-Olivier Vidouze praised the film as a whole, but argued that despite containing the basic characteristics of martial arts films, the action scenes' fast pace makes them the weakest part of Secret Service Of The Imperial Court. Vidouze also praised the cast: Leung Kar Yan for his performance in drama and action scenes, and Ku Feng for a convincing performance as a tortured father. He argued that Secret Service Of The Imperial Court was one of the last great achievements of the Shaw Brothers Studio. He argued that the greatest quality of the film is the emotional power generated by the complex scenarios. It comments on ideas of duty: the duty of a son to his father, the duty of an officer of the law to political superiors, and the duty of a clan leader to the community. The film presents many responses to these dilemmas and forces each character to choose a path.

Tatu Piispanen argued in Elitisti that Secret Service of the Imperial Court was the last absolutely successful martial arts film made by the Shaw Brothers, who closed in 1986, and he went on to say that it was the one of the best of the new wave of Wuxia of the 1980s. Piispanen praised its directorial innovation, sets, cinematography, and music, but most of all lauded the performances of its actors. Despite some idiosyncratic actions by specific characters, he wrote that the film's "superior acting sets it above its competitors". Although the fight scenes were sped up, Piispanen praised the choreography and swordsmanship.

Both reviews mentioned a similarity to the Lone Wolf and Cub films, especially in the large amounts of gore and body parts during fight scenes and the theme of a lone warrior fleeing with his son.

Box office
The film grossed HK$1,376,722 during its theatrical run from 19 October to 23 October 1984.

References

External links
 
 Secret Service Of The Imperial Court at the Hong Kong Cinemagic
 

1984 films
1984 action films
1984 martial arts films
Hong Kong action films
Hong Kong martial arts films
Kung fu films
Wuxia films
1980s Mandarin-language films
Shaw Brothers Studio films
Films set in 15th-century Ming dynasty
1980s Hong Kong films